The Captain Hates the Sea is a 1934 comedy film directed by Lewis Milestone and released by Columbia Pictures. The film, which involves a Grand Hotel-style series of intertwining stories involving the passengers on a cruise ship, is notable as the last feature film of silent film icon John Gilbert and the first Columbia feature to include The Three Stooges (Curly Howard, Moe Howard and Larry Fine) in the cast, cast as the ship's orchestra.  The film also stars Victor McLaglen, Arthur Treacher, Akim Tamiroff, Leon Errol and Walter Connolly.

Plot
Alcoholic newspaperman Steve Bramley boards the ship San Capador for a restful cruise, hoping to quit drinking and begin writing a book. Also on board are Steve's friend Schulte, a private detective hoping to nab criminal Danny Checkett with a fortune in stolen bonds. Steve begins drinking, all the while observing the various stories of other passengers on board, several of whom turn out not to be who they seem to be.

Cast

 Victor McLaglen - Junius P. Schulte
 Wynne Gibson - Mrs. Jeddock
 Alison Skipworth - Mrs. Yolanda Magruder
 John Gilbert - Steve Bramley
 Helen Vinson - Janet Grayson
 Fred Keating - Danny Checkett
 Leon Errol - Layton
 Walter Connolly - Captain Helquist
 Tala Birell - Gerta Klangi
 Walter Catlett - Joe Silvers
 John Wray – Mr. Jeddock
 Claude Gillingwater – Judge Griswold
 Emily Fitzroy – Mrs. Victoria Griswold
 Donald Meek - Josephus Bushmills
 Luis Alberni – Juan Gilboa
 Akim Tamiroff – General Salazaro
 Arthur Treacher – Major Warringforth
 Inez Courtney – Flo
 G. Pat Collins – Donlin
 The Three Stooges – Orchestra Musicians

Production
During production, the film went over budget due in large part to the alcohol-fueled partying by Gilbert, McLaglen, Errol, Catlett and Connolly. Harry Cohn, the head of Columbia, became alarmed and sent a cable to Lewis Milestone that read: "Hurry up! The cost is staggering!" Milestone, in turn, sent a cable to Cohn that read: "So is the cast!"

The exterior footage of the San Capeador (filmed at San Pedro Harbor) would be recycled in the Three Stooges' short Dunked in the Deep.

A DVD of The Captain Hates the Sea was released on August 2, 2011 by Sony and is available at shop.tcm.com .

References

External links
 
 
 
 

1934 films
The Three Stooges films
Columbia Pictures films
1934 comedy films
American black-and-white films
American slapstick comedy films
Films set on ships
Films directed by Lewis Milestone
1930s English-language films
1930s American films